Misthodotes is an extinct genus of mayflies which existed during the Permian of what is now the United States and Russia. It was described by E.H. Sellards in 1909. A new species, M. tshernovae, was described from the Upper Permian epoch of Russia by N. D. Sinitshenkova and D. V. Vassilenko in 2012.

Species
 Misthodotes biguttatus Tillyard, 1932
 Misthodotes delicatulus Tillyard, 1936
 Misthodotes edmundsi Carpenter, 1979
 Misthodotes obtusus (Sellards, 1907)
 Misthodotes ovalis Tillyard, 1932
 Misthodotes tshernovae Sinitshenkova & Vassilenko, 2012

References

External links
 Misthodotes at the Paleobiology Database

Prehistoric insect genera
Mayfly genera
Permian insects
Prehistoric insects of North America
Fossil taxa described in 1909